Şahap Kavcıoğlu (born 23 May 1967) is a Turkish banker and politician. He was a Member of the Grand National Assembly of Turkey for the Justice and Development Party (AKP) and is the current Governor of the Central Bank of the Republic of Turkey. He is also a contributor to the newspaper Yeni Safak and is described as a supporter of the economic policies of Recep Tayyip Erdoğan.

Education 
He  graduated in economics at the Dokuz Eylül University and followed up on his studies at the Istanbul University obtaining a degree as an Audit Specialist. He studied Business Administration at Hasting's College (now East Sussex College) in England. In 2003, he earned a Ph.D from the Banking and Insurance Institute of the Marmara University.

Professional career 
Beginning in 1991, he served during nine years in several positions as well as an Assistant General Manager at Esbank. According to his LinkedIn page, from 2003 onwards Kavcıoğlu served as a regional coordinator for two years and a deputy general manager for Halkbank for ten years. On 20 March 2021, Kavcıoğlu replaced Naci Ağbal as the Chief of the Turkish Central Bank the day after a raise of the interest rate to 19%.  Since, Kavcıoğlu supported Erdoğans desires for lower interest rates and cut them from 19% to 15%. The lower interest of 15%, was met with a fall of the Turkish Lira (₺) to a temporary all-time low of 13.49 ₺ per Dollar.

Political career 
Representing the Justice and Development Party (AKP) for Bayburt, he was elected to the Turkish Parliament in the General Elections of November 2015.

Plagiarism allegations 
He was accused of having performed plagiarism in the thesis he presented to the Marmara University, as passages in his thesis and the annual report of the Turkish Central Bank are exactly the same.

Publications 
He is the author of several papers and two books.

Personal life 
Kavcıoğlu is married and has three children. He is a Congress Member of Galatasaray Sports Club and also the Dokuz Eylül University Alumni Association.

References 

1967 births
Living people
People from Bayburt
Dokuz Eylül University alumni
Istanbul University alumni
Turkish economists
Turkish bankers
Justice and Development Party (Turkey) politicians
Deputies of Bayburt
Members of the 26th Parliament of Turkey
Yeni Şafak people
Governors of the Central Bank of Turkey